Wales Playhouse is a 30-minute UK dramatic anthology series produced by and airing on BBC Wales.  Twenty-two episodes aired from 1990–96.  Guest stars included Brenda Blethyn, Jack Wild, and Andrew Howard.

External links

1990 British television series debuts
1996 British television series endings
1990s Welsh television series